The discography of Australian rock band The Easybeats.

Studio albums

Live albums

Extended plays

Compilation albums

Singles

In Spanish

Notes

References

Discographies of Australian artists
Pop music discographies